Paranonychidae is a family of armoured harvestmen in the order Opiliones. There are about 6 genera and at least 20 described species in Paranonychidae.

Genera
 Kainonychus Suzuki, 1975
 Kaolinonychus Suzuki, 1975
 Metanonychus Briggs, 1971
 Paranonychus Briggs, 1971
 Sclerobunus Banks, 1893
 Zuma C.J. Goodnight & M.L. Goodnight, 1942

References

Further reading

 
 

Harvestmen
Harvestman families